Yves Mondesir (born October 12, 1972), better known by his stage name DJ Whoo Kid, is an American hip-hop DJ. He is currently signed to G-Unit Records and its subsidiary label, Shadyville Entertainment. He is the host of The Whoolywood Shuffle on Sirius/XM Radio Shade 45. His productions often incorporate a clip of him shouting his stage name. He's had two albums chart on the Billboard 200, XXL Presents: Bad Season with Tech N9ne (#118 in 2011) and The Whoodlum Ball with Smith and Hay and Ranna Royce (#156 in 2018).

Early life
DJ Whoo Kid was born 'Yves Mondesir on October 12, 1975, in Brooklyn, New York, and is of Haitian descent. He grew up in Queens Village, New York, and has strong ties to Cap-Haïtien, Haiti.

Discography

Hosted mixtapes
Steve-O
 2008: The Dumbest Asshole In Hip Hop

MGK
2012: EST 4 Life

Raekwon
2009: Coke Up in Da Dollar Bill (with DJ Scream)

50 Cent
2002: 50 Cent Is the Future
2002: No Mercy, No Fear
2002: God's Plan
2002: Automatic Gunfire
2003: BulletProof Jacket
2007: Curtis Chunugs (Mixtape)
2007: Curtis Continues To bE fat
2007: After Curtis 2007 (G-Unit Radio Special)
2007: Bulletproof The Mixtape
2009: War Angel LP
2009: Forever King

Jae Millz
2006: Harlem Nights
2010: Dead Presidents

Young Buck
2003: The Sopranos: The Dirty Reloaded
2004: Welcome To The Hood
2006: Chronic 2006
2006: Pow!!! Radio: Volume 2: Hosted by Young Buck
2007: G-Unit Radio Pt.24 the Clean Up Man
2007: Product of the South
2007: Best of G-Unit Radio (Young Buck Edition)
2015: Before the Beast

Lloyd Banks
2003: Money in the Bank Part 1
2003: Mo Money in the Bank Part 2
2003: S.W.A.T: Global Mixtape Strike Team
2004: The Hunger For More Tour: Live
2004: Mo Money in the Bank Part 3 – Ca$hing In
2006: Mo Money in the Bank Part 4 – Gang Green Season
2006: Mo Money in the Bank Part 5 – The Final Chapter
2007: Best of Banks
2008: 5 and Better Series Volume 1 – Return of the PLK
2008: 5 and Better Series Volume 2 – Halloween Havoc
2009: 5 and Better Series Volume 3 – The Cold Corner
2009: 5 and Better Series Volume 4 – Reborn
2009: 5 and Better Series Volume 5 – V5

Tech N9ne
2010: Bad Season (with DJ Scream)

Tego Calderón
2005: GuasaGuasa

Tony Yayo
2008: S.O.D
2008: Black Friday
2008: Bloody Xmas
2009: Swine Flu
2009: Swine Flu 2
2009: Public Enemies
2010: Gun Powder Guru 2 (The Remixes) With DJ Scream
2012: Sex, Drugs, & Hip-Hop

Waka Flocka Flame
2014: "I Can't Rap: Vol. 1"
2015: "Salute Me or Shoot Me 5"

Tinie Tempah
2010: Micro Mixtape
2011: Foreign Object

Spider Loc
2006: Bangadoshish (L.A. Kings)
2006: G-Unit Radio Part. 18 (Rags 2 Riches)
2008: Connected: Volume 3: It's The Network
2008: Connected: Volume 4
2009: Connected: Volume 5
2009: The Best of Spider Loc: Volume 1
2009: Reptible
2009: Connected: Volume 6

40 Glocc
2008: Outspoken 3 (hosted by DJ Strong & 50 Cent)
2008: I Am Legend
2009: Mo'Fro Presents...

G-Unit
G-Unit Radio
2003: Smokin' Day 2 (G-Unit Radio Part 1)
2003: International Ballers (G-Unit Radio Part 2)
2003: Takin' It to the Streets (Hosted by LeBron James) (G-Unit Radio Part 3)
2003: No Peace Talks! (G-Unit Radio Part 4)
2004: All Eyez on Us (G-Unit Radio Part 5)
2004: Motion Picture Shit (Hosted by Floyd Mayweather) (G-Unit Radio Part 6)
2004: Footwear by RBK: Volume 1
2004: King of New York (G-Unit Radio Part 7)
2004: The Game: The Fifth Element (Hosted by Steve-O) (G-Unit Radio Part 8)
2004: Young Buck: G-Unit City (G-Unit Radio Part 9)
2005: 2050 Before the Massacre (G-Unit Radio Part 10)
2005: Tony Yayo: Raw-n-Uncut (Hosted by Eminem) (G-Unit Radio Part 11)
2005: Olivia: So Seductive (G-Unit Radio Part 12)
2005: The Return of the Mixtape Millionaire (G-Unit Radio Part 13)
2005: Back to Business (G-Unit Radio Part 14)
2005: Are You a Window Shopper? (G-Unit Radio Part 15)
2006: Mase: Crucified 4 da Hood (G-Unit Radio Part 16)
2006: Mobb Deep: Best in the Bizness (G-Unit Radio Part 17)
2006: Spider Loc: Rags to Riches (G-Unit Radio Part 18)
2006: Freeway: Rep Yo Click (G-Unit Radio Part 19)
2006: Mobb Deep: Best in the Bizness 2 (G-Unit Radio Part 20)
2006: Hate It or Love It (G-Unit Radio Part 21)
2006: Hip Hop Is Dead - Verse 2 (G-Unit Radio Part 22)
U.S. Sales: 900,221
2007: Tony Yayoyo: Finally off Papers (Hosted by Snoop from The Wire) (G-Unit Radio Part 23)
2007: Young Buck: The Clean Up Man (Hosted by LeBron James) (G-Unit Radio Part 24)
2007: Sabrina's Baby Boy (Hosted by Chris Rock) (G-Unit Radio Part 25)

This is 50
2008: Return of the Body Snatchers (This is 50 Volume 1)
2008: The Elephant in the Sand (This is 50 Volume 2)
2008: Sincerely Yours Southside(This is 50 Volume 3)
2008: Tony Yayo: S.O.D. (This is 50 Volume 4)

G-Unit Radio West
2005: LA American Wasteland (G-Unit Radio West Volume 1)

Jay Star
2010 "Rise of a Star" (Hosted by "Dj Whoo Kid")

Maino
2009: Unstoppable

Mobb Deep
2004: The New Mobb Deep (Hosted by DJ Whoo Kid & the Alchemist)
2000: H.N.I.C. The Mixtape Vol. 1 (Whoo Kid & Prodigy Of Mobb Deep)

Mazaradi FOX
2007: Fresh Out da Body Shop (Hosted by DJ Whoo Kid, 50 Cent & Mazaradi FOX)

Obie Trice
2006: Bar Shots
2007: The Most Under Rated
2012: Watch The Chrome

Mike Knox
2008: Killadelphia (Hosted With Tony Yayo)
2010: Money Machine

Lil' Kim
 2007: Ms. G.O.A.T.
 2007: Ms. G.O.A.T. 2

Bishop Lamont
2008: The Confessional

Nyce Da Future
2008: 38 in the Head

Shawty Lo
2009: Fright Night

Capone-N-Noreaga
2008: CNN Back on that Q.U.Shit

Vlad "Haitian V" Calixte
2008: New Elevator Music

Cashis & Young De
2008: Homeland Security

Jrocwell
2009: Most Anticipated Artist of 2009

Nixon Nyce
2009: I Can Only Be Me

Murda Mixtape (With Stretch Armstrong)
1999: Murda Mixtape 2000 Vol. 1 
1999: Murda Mixtape 2000 Vol. 2 
2000: Murda Mixtape Vol. 3 (Hosted by The LOX)
2000: Murda Mixtape Vol. 4 (Hosted by Capone 'N Noreaga)
2000: Murda Mixtape Vol. 5 (Hosted by Prodigy of Mobb Deep)
2007: Murphy's Law (The New Murda Mixtape)
2009: 45 Ways 2 Die

Final Destination (With Stretch Armstrong)
2000: Final Destination Vol. 1 - ??? (Hosted by ???)
2000: Final Destination Vol. 2 - Life Ain't a Game (Hosted by Ja Rule)
2001: Final Destination Vol. 3 - Queenz 2 New Orleanz (Hosted by U.T.P.)

G.A.G.E.
2006: DJ Whoo Kid & Dr. Dre Presents G.A.G.E.
2006: DJ Whoo Kid & Dr. Dre Presents G.A.G.E. - Crack Murder & Missed Meals

DeStorm Power
2012: Be Careful

Tapes
1997: 90 Minute Shootout Vol. 1
1997: 90 Minute Shootout Vol. 2
 1999: Niggas Don't Want It
 2000: Allstar Birthday Bash (hosted by Hype Williams)
 2001: Unbreakable (hosted by Eminem)
 2001: Escape From New York (hosted by Nas)
2001: Hydro
2002: Hydro Vol. 2
2002: State of Emergency with Dj Kay Slay (hosted by Snoop Dogg)
2003: The Sopranos Mixtape (Dirty Reloaded) (hosted by Young Buck)

Set It Off !
2007: Set It Off Vol. 1
2008: Set It Off Vol. 2
2009: Set It Off Vol. 3
2010: Set It Off Vol. 4

Snoop Dogg
2002: State Of Emergency (With DJ Kay Slay)
2003: Westside Reloaded
2004: The Revival
2004: Welcome To The Chuuch Vol.4: Sunday School
2004: Welcome To The Chuuch Vol.5: Snoop Dogg For President
2007: Tha Blue Carpet Treatment Mixtape (With DJ Drama & DJ Skee)
2008: Landy & Egg Nogg: A DPG Christmas
2009: I Wanna Rock Mixtape (with DJ Skee & DJ Scream)
2010: We Da West (With DJ Skee & DJ Scream)

The Afterparty (Blends)
1998: The Afterparty Vol. 1 - ??? (Hosted by ???)
1998: The Afterparty Vol. 2 - ??? (Hosted by ???)
1999: The Afterparty Vol. 3 - ??? (Hosted by ???)
2000: The Afterparty Vol. 4 - ??? (Hosted by ???)
2000: The Afterparty Vol. 5 - Southern Heat (Hosted by Lil' Kim)
2000: The Afterparty Vol. 6 - Survivor Ice Party (Hosted by ???)
2000: The Afterparty Vol. 7 - ??? (Hosted by Eminem)
2000: The Afterparty Vol. 8 - QB's Finest (Hosted by Dirty Money Records)
2000: The Afterparty Vol. 9 - Southern Hospitality (Hosted by Sisqó)
2000: The Afterparty Vol. 10 - ??? (Hosted by ???)
2000: The Afterparty Vol. 11 - ??? (Hosted by DJ Clue)
2000: The Afterparty Vol. 12 - ??? (Hosted by ???)
2001: The Afterparty Vol. 13 - ??? (Hosted by P. Diddy & DJ Whoo Kid)
2001: The Afterparty Vol. 14 - City Of Pimps (Hosted by Ron Isley & P. Diddy)

POW!
2006: POW! Radio Vol. 1
2006: POW! Radio Vol. 2 (With DJ Mandog & Coach PR; Hosted by Young Buck)
2006: POW! Radio Vol. 3 - Mixtapes On A Plane (Hosted by 50 Cent & Samuel L. Jackson)
2006: POW! Radio Vol. 4 - The Transporter (Hosted by Lloyd Banks, Arnold Schwarzenegger & Jason Statham)
2006: POW! Radio Vol. 5 - Pimpin' Pimpin' (Hosted by Katt Williams)
2007: POW! Radio Vol. 6 - Happy Birthday Whoo Kid!
2007: POW! Radio Vol. 7 - Best Of Banks (Hosted by Lloyd Banks)
2007: POW! Radio Vol. 8 - Position Of Power (Hosted by RIZ)
2007: POW! Radio Vol. 9 - The Cons Vol. 5 (Hosted by Consequence)
2008: POW! Radio Vol. 10 - Drug Users Handbook (Hosted by Tony Yayo)
2006: POW! Artist Series Vol. 1 - 50 Cent - Best Of 50 Cent
2006: POW! Artist Series Vol. 2 - Peedi Crakk - Torture (Crakk Is Bakk)
2006: POW! Artist Series Vol. 3 - Obie Trice - The Most Underrated
2006: POW! Artist Series Vol. 4 - Memphis Bleek - Heir To The Throne
2006: POW! Artist Series Vol. 5 - 50 Cent - Best Of 50 Cent 2 (This One's For My Bitches)
2007: POW! Young Buck - Mr. Ten-A-Key Product Of The South

The Hyphy Movement (With DJ E-Rock)
2005: Bay Bidness The Mixtape
2005: Bay Bidness Vol. 2
2006: Bay Bidness Vol. 3
2006: Bay Bidness Vol. 3.5 (With J-Espinosa)

Max Payne
2002: Max Payne The Official Mixtape (Queens To New Orleans Vol. 2) (Hosted by Baby & N.O.R.E.)
2002: Max Payne 2 (Hosted by 50 Cent)

Canadian Coke
2006: Canadian Coke Vol. 1 (Hosted by Kardinal Offishall)
2006: Canadian Coke Vol. 2

The New Next
2005: The New Next - Moisture Mixtape Lost In Dubai (Hosted by 50 Cent)
2006: Next - The Next Level (Japanese Import)

D-Block
2003: D-Block The Mixtape
2004: Jadakiss Vs Beanie Sigel - Rap The Vote Mixtape

Kool G Rap
2005: Dead Or Alive

Sam Scarfo
2006: The Corner

Stat Quo
2005: Zone 3 (Hosted by Eminem)

Busta Rhymes
2004: Surrender The Mixtape

Nipsey Hussle
2009: Bullets Ain't Got No Names Vol. 3

Trav
2009: Follow Me

2Pac & Cookin' Soul
2009: Night of the Living Dead (2Pac Edition)

C-Squared
2011: Makaveli vs. Mathers 2

M.O.B
2011: Awake In A Surgery

Max B
2008: Public Domain 3
2009: Coke Wave

Crooked I
2008: Da Block Obama

B.G.
2008: Champion

DJ Paul
2010: Too Kill Again (with DJ Scream)

J. Cole
2007: J Cole, The Come Up, (DJ ill Will)

Juicy J & Project Pat
2010: Cut Throat 2 (Dinner Thieves), (with DJ Scream)

Jay Rock
2010: From Hood Tales To The Cover Of XXL, (with DJ Scream)

Juvenile
2009: Undefeated, With (DJ Scream)

Kidd Kidd
2009: New Kid On Da Block, With (DJ Scream)

Doesya Smoke
2008: King Doesya

NOE
2008: NOE Torious Kid

Tupac Shakur, Michael Jackson, the Notorious B.I.G. & Cookin' Soul
2008: Night Of The Living Dead
2009: Happy Birthday
2009: Night Of The Living Dead II

Sammy Adams
2010: Party Records

D12
2015: The Devil's Night Mixtape

Tinie Tempah
2010: Micro Mixtape
2011: Foreign Object (Hosted by Russell Brand)

Skepta
2011: Community Payback

Giggs
2011: Take Your Hats Off

Wiley
2011: Creating A Buzz Volume 1 (Hosted by Ashley Cole)

Ghetts
2011: Momentum

Pink Grenade
2014: The Famous As Fuck Tape (Produced by Jonathan Hay and Mike Smith)

Eminem
2014: Eminem Vs. DJ Whoo Kid Shady Classics

Nasty C
2020: "Zulu" mixtape

Filmography

References

External links
DJ Whoo Kid
Shadyville Entertainment DJs

G-Unit Records artists
American rappers of Haitian descent
Mixtape DJs
People from West Orange, New Jersey
People from Queens, New York
Shadyville Entertainment artists
Musicians from New Jersey
1975 births
Living people
American hip hop DJs
East Coast hip hop musicians
21st-century American rappers